Riaz Amin (born 27 February 1998) is an English martial artist who practices Shotokan Karate and Filipino Martial Arts. He is the current World Escrima-Kalis-Arnis Federation (WEKAF) World Championships world champion.

Early life
Amin was born in Tower Hamlets, London, England and is a third generation British Bangladeshi. He attended Coopers' Company and Coborn School.

Martial arts career
At the age of five, Amin started martial arts in Shotokan Karate with Alton Brown (2nd Dan) and Joe Anderson (7th Dan) of Toyakwai Karate Association. He then started competing at local, national and international competitions. He won various gold medals such as The English Open and Southern Regional Championships. At the age of 11, he achieved his 1st Dan black belt. At the age of 13, he started learning Filipino Martial Arts (FMA) at the FMA Academy under Shamim Haque and Abjol Miah. Haque teaches Amin the deadly blade art 'Kalis Ilustrisimo'.

Since starting karate, Amin has competed in many major competitions. In 2008, he took Gold, Silver and Bronze in the Malta Four Nations International Open Championship organised by SKSM Karate Malta, and came 4th in the Funakoshi World Championships. In 2009, he won Gold in the European Karate Federation (EKF) International, Essex Grand National Open Championship and Capital Open Championship.

On 2 December 2012, at the age of 14, Amin entered his first full contact tournament at the British World Escrima-Kalis-Arnis Federation (WEKAF) Tournament and became the Single Stick Cadet fighter of the day British champion.

In July 2014, Amin became a Cadet's squad member for Great Britain and was given the opportunity to compete in the WEKAF World Championships in Budapest, Hungary. The fighting style encompasses many forms and is based around the Filipino martial-arts based system, and he was involved in hand-to-hand combat. He entered three events, the double, single and soft stick/first strike, and won medals in each category. He beat a Hungarian opponent in the final to become the world champion.

From 2005 to 2014, he has fought in more than 50 tournaments. He now trains in karate under Alton Brown, Raphael Veras and others from the England Karate Squad.

In September 2014, Amin was interviewed by Nadia Ali on BBC Asian Network.

Honours

See also
British Bangladeshi
List of British Bangladeshis

References

External links

1998 births
Living people
English Muslims
English people of Bangladeshi descent
English male karateka
English eskrimadors
Shotokan practitioners
Sportspeople from London
People from the London Borough of Tower Hamlets
People educated at Coopers' Company and Coborn School

bn:রিয়াজ আমিন